Thomas or Tom Gill may refer to:

 Thomas Gill (1788–1861), British Whig politician and industrialist
 Thomas Gill (architect) (1870–1941), American architect
 Thomas Gill (footballer) (born 1965), Norwegian football goalkeeper
 Thomas Gill (politician) (1922–2009), U.S. Representative from Hawaii, Lieutenant Governor of Hawaii
 Thomas Andrew Gill (1886–1947), American football and baseball player, coach of football, basketball, and baseball
 Thomas Edward Gill (1908–1973), American Roman Catholic bishop
 Tom Gill (actor) (1916–1971), British actor
 Tom Gill (anthropologist) (born 1960), Japan-based social anthropologist
 Tom Gill (artist) (1913–2005), cartoonist and comic book artist best known for The Lone Ranger
 Tom Gill (public servant) (1849–1923), Under-Treasurer in South Australia
 Tom Gill (writer) (1891–1972), American forester, fiction and non-fiction author, and editor of psychiatry journal
 T. P. Gill (1858–1931), Irish politician
 Frank Gill (politician) (Thomas Francis Gill, 1917–1982), New Zealand air force pilot and politician
 Harry Gill (politician) (Thomas Harry Gill, 1885–1955), British politician